Bangalaia angolensis is a species of beetle in the family Cerambycidae. It was described by Stephan von Breuning in 1938. It is known from Angola.

References

Endemic fauna of Angola
Prosopocerini
Beetles described in 1938